The CD302 antigen also known as C-type lectin domain family 13 member A is a protein that in humans is encoded by the CD302 gene.

Function 

CD302 is a C-type lectin receptor involved in cell adhesion and migration, as well as endocytosis and phagocytosis.

References

External links

Further reading